Wonalancet is an unincorporated community in the northwestern corner of the town of Tamworth in Carroll County, New Hampshire, United States.  Many popular hiking trails into the Sandwich Range of the White Mountains have trailheads in the area, particularly in the locale known as Ferncroft, up a short spur road from Wonalancet.

The village is named for the 17th century Pennacook sachem Wonalancet.

Wonalancet has a separate ZIP code (03897) from the rest of Tamworth.

References

External links
Wonalancet Out Door Club

Unincorporated communities in New Hampshire
Unincorporated communities in Carroll County, New Hampshire
Tamworth, New Hampshire
New Hampshire placenames of Native American origin